is a former Japanese football player.

Tomiyama previously played for Shonan Bellmare in the J2 League.

Club statistics

References

External links

1982 births
Living people
Ryutsu Keizai University alumni
Association football people from Chiba Prefecture
Japanese footballers
J2 League players
Japan Football League players
Shonan Bellmare players
Gainare Tottori players
Association football defenders